William Wait may refer to:
 William Bell Wait (1839 – 1916), teacher for the New York Institute for the Education of the Blind
 William C. Wait (1860–1935), Justice of the Massachusetts Supreme Judicial Court
 William H. Wait (1842 – 1902), American politician
 William Killigrew Wait (1826 – 1902), Bristol merchant and Conservative Member of Parliament for Gloucester

See also 
 Wait (name)

Wait, William